Valentin Bayer (born 8 December 1999) is an Austrian swimmer. He represented Austria at the 2019 World Aquatics Championships in Gwangju, South Korea. He competed in the men's 100 metre breaststroke and men's 200 metre breaststroke events.

In 2017, he won the silver medal in the boys' 200 m breaststroke at the European Junior Swimming Championships held in Netanya, Israel.

In 2020, he set a new Austrian record in the men's 100 metre breaststroke at the inaugural 4 Nations Meet held in Budapest, Hungary.

References 

Living people
1999 births
Place of birth missing (living people)
Austrian male breaststroke swimmers
European Aquatics Championships medalists in swimming
20th-century Austrian people
21st-century Austrian people